Musgrave is a small township in Queensland, Australia. It is within the locality of Yarraden in the local government area of the Shire of Cook. It bordered on the tribal lands of the Yetteneru to the east.

Heritage listings
Musgrave has a number of heritage-listed sites, including:
 Peninsula Development Road: Musgrave Telegraph Station

References

External links 

 
Towns in Queensland